Moybeg Kirley (and Corrbahile meaning "prominent townland") is a townland lying within the civil parish of Kilcronaghan, County Londonderry, Northern Ireland. It lies in the north-west of the parish, with the Moyola River forming its northern boundary. It is bounded by the townlands of Drumconready, Drumcrow, Kirley, Moneyguiggy, and Moneyshanere. It was apportioned to the Drapers company.

The townland was part of Tobermore electoral ward of the former Magherafelt District Council, however in 1926 it was part of Carnamoney district electoral division as part of the Draperstown dispensary (registrar's) district of Magherafelt Rural District. It was also part of the historic barony of Loughinsholin.

History

Trivia 

In 2016, the PBS Masterpiece Theater created a mini-series called My Mother and Other Strangers. This series is based in a fictional village called "Moybeg".

See also
Kilcronaghan
List of townlands in Tobermore
Tobermore

References

Townlands of County Londonderry
Civil parish of Kilcronaghan